Department of Archaeology is one of the government agency of Bangladesh. By the Laws of Archaeology 1964 (amended in 1976) this agency maintains the conservation and preservation of archaeological sites in the country. Since 2013, the department has been running its activities from the Administration Building situated in Agargaon in Dhaka.

History 
The organization was first founded in 1861 as a part of the Archaeological Survey of India. After the independence of Bangladesh its office was established in Dhaka. In 1983 regional offices were established in the then 4 divisions including Dhaka as the headquarter by divisional rearrangement.

Agency Functions 

Department of Archaeology (Bangladesh) compiles and also conserves the list of archaeological sites and artifacts of Bangladesh. Currently (June 2016) there are 452 archaeological sites under the conservation of this department. Some of the mentionable among them are- Mahasthangarh, Mainamati, Somapura Mahavihara, Shita Coat Bihar, Nawabganj, Kantajew Temple, Choto Sona Mosque, Sixty Dome Mosque, Vasu Vihara, Barobazar, Lalbagh Fort. Among these, Somapura Mahavihara and Sixty Dome Mosque have been recognized as World Heritage Sites. Also there are 17 Archaeology museums under the administration of this department. The department works on to recover history by discovering ancient cultural elements from remote areas scattered within the country, and to repair and preserve the discovered monuments and exhibit them.

Museums 
Currently there are 17 museums administered by Department of Archaeology.

Dhaka Division:

 Lalbagh Museum
 Panam Nagar
 Baliati Museum
 Mymensingh Museum

Rajshahi Division:

 Paharpur Museum
 Bagha Museum
 Archaeological Museum, Mahasthan
 Rabindra Kachharibari Museum
 Patisar Museum
 Chalan Beel Museum

Rangpur Division:

 Tajhat Palace Museum

Khulna Division:

 Khulna Divisional Museum
 Bagerhat Museum
 Shilaidaha Kuthibari Museum
 M.M. Dutt Bari Museum
 Rabindra Complex, Dakkhindihi

Chittagong Division:

 Mainamati Museum
 Ethnological Museum, Chittagong

Barisal Division:

 Sher-e-Bangla Sriti Museum

                   Time Schedule
 

             VISITING HOURS FOR MUSEUMS:

 

1st April to 30th September                 1st October to 30th March

Tuesday to Saturday                                Tuesday to Saturday

10 am to 6 pm                                            9 am to 5 pm

Leisure: 1 pm to 1.30 pm                        Leisure: 1 pm to 1.30 pm

Friday                                                     Friday
10 am to 12.30 pm and                             9 am to 12.30 pm and

2.30 pm to 6pm                                          2 pm to 5 pm

Monday                                               Monday

2.30 pm to 6 pm                                           1.30 pm to 5pm

List of Publication

Heritage Sell Department of Archaeology Videos

References 

Government agencies of Bangladesh
Bangladesh, Archaeology, Department of
Government departments of Bangladesh
Organisations based in Dhaka
1972 establishments in Bangladesh
Archaeology of Bangladesh